Henry Bidou (28 June 1873 – 14 February 1943) was a French writer, literary critic and war correspondent.

Life 
Born in Givet, Bidou studied at the   jesuit college. He later joined the Institut catholique de Paris (ICP) and continued his studies until he obtained two doctoral theses on Siberia and then studied law, before becoming Professor of history, geography and literature at the Lycée privé Sainte-Geneviève, then at the ICP and the Faculty of Letters.

Bidou destined himself for a military career. He partially renounced it after a horse accident in his youth that led to the amputation of one of his legs. Since he couldn't perform his military service, he became a war correspondent and military columnist.

He had an eclectic professional career in a wide variety of professions: geographer, historian, journalist, lecturer, literary critic, musicographer, painter and poet. He took advantage of his missions abroad to satisfy his passion for travel, facilitated by his mastery of several foreign languages. Polyglot, he spoke French, English, German, Spanish, Italian and Russian.

An amateur painter, Bidou worked with Edmond Aman-Jean, Raphaël Collin and Jacques-Émile Blanche and exhibited at the Élysée gallery.

It was his activity as a war correspondent that led him to Vichy in 1940 by the government of Marshal Pétain. It is in this city that he died in 1943.

Traveller 
Bidou made numerous trips to Russia as part of the writing of his theses on Siberia, then around the world for his other activities.

As a journalist or for his leisure time, he travelled through Poland, Uruguay, Japan, Cambodia, Indochina, the Rhineland, Italy, where he met Benito Mussolini, as well as Scandinavia and the Poles.

He followed military operations as a war correspondent in Syria, Lebanon and Morocco during the 1920s.

He drew several stories from his travels, such as Le Nid de cygnes after discovering the Nordic countries.

Journalist and critic 
Bidou entered the Journal des débats in 1899, where he worked until 1929. As an editor, he wrote various columns Au jour le jour, La semaine dramatique, and military chronicles during the war, under the patronyme Colonel X. He served as war correspondent for the newspaper from 1915 to 1923.

He contributed to numerous newspapers over the years (Le Figaro, whose foreign policy services he directed between 1922 and 1925, the Revue des deux Mondes, Vu, Le Temps, Sept Jours, L'Opinion, La Revue critique des idées et des livres, Présent, L'Intransigeant, Paris-Soir, La Revue des revues, L’Éclair, Le Sillon, La Revue hebdomadaire,  and Voici la France de ce mois.

Bidou made himself also known as music critic for L'Opinion, and literary critic at La Revue de Paris.

Author-lecturer 
He published numerous works during his life, plays (Rosenice, 1894), novels (Marie de Sainte-Heureuse, 1912) as well as technical and specialised books, on his career as a teacher, researcher and traveller (Le Roman de la terre), on history (Le Château de Blois, 1931, Paris, 1937). In this field, he is the author of Volume IX, La Grande Guerre, of L’Histoire de France contemporaine depuis la Révolution jusqu'à la paix in 1919 by Ernest Lavisse.

Author of a book on Paul Claudel, he was preparing a study on Molière when he died.

He gave distinguished lectures throughout the world on various subjects: Alexandre Dumas for example, often at the invitation of the Ministry of Foreign Affairs.

War correspondent 
Despite his disability, Bidou took a close interest in military affairs. He was war correspondent on several occasions, during the First World War (attached to the GQG), during the Russo-Polish war, at the front in Syria alongside General Gouraud. He continued this activity during the Second World War and chronicled Paris-Soir until the day before his death.

Homages 
Marshal Juin, one of his former listeners, quoted him in his reception speech at the Académie française and in Maurice Genevoix's reply speech, who described him as "a free and original spirit. »

His influence is confirmed by his mention in several other reception and response speeches, the speech of Robert Kemp, who describes his Histoire de la guerre as "masterly", that of Henry Bordeaux, André Bellessort, in the reply of Marcel Pagnol to Marcel Achard.

Awards 
 Croix de guerre 1914 -1918
 Officier de la Légion d’honneur
 Officer of the Order of Vasa
 Officer of the Order of the British Empire
 Commandeur of the Order of Polonia Restituta
 Commandeur of the Nicham Ifthikar
 Commandeur of the Order of the Medjidie
 Commandeur of the Royal Order of Cambodia
 Commandeur of the Order of the Crown of Italy

Works 
 1894: Rosenice (play), Le Sillon
 1912: Marie de Sainte-Heureuse (novel), Calmann-Lévy
 1912: L’Année dramatique 1911-1912 (series of articles), Hachette
 1913: L’Année dramatique 1912-1913 (series of articles), Hachette
 1919: Les Conséquences de la guerre, Librairie Félix Alcan
 1922: Histoire de France (Tome 9), Hachette
 1922: Histoire de la Grande Guerre, Éditions Gallimard
 ; English translation: 
 1929: Le Nid de Cygnes (novel), Flammarion
 1930: C’est tout et ce n’est rien (novel), Calmann-Lévy
 1931: Le château de Blois, Calmann-Lévy
 1936: Berlin, Bernard Grasset
 1937: Paris, Gallimard
 1938: 900 lieues sur l’Amazone, Gallimard
 1940: La Conquête des pôles, Gallimard
 1940: La Bataille de France, Édition du Milieu du Monde
 1944: L’Afrique, Flammarion (posthumous)
 La Terre héroïque

Forewords

Bibliography

References 

20th-century French journalists
20th-century French writers
French music critics
1873 births
People from Givet
1943 deaths
Officiers of the Légion d'honneur
Writers about music